The fifth season of Big Brother Germany lasted for one year from 2 March 2004 to 1 March 2005 and is therefore the longest running Big Brother show worldwide.  This season is the longest uninterrupted live television broadcast according to Guinness World Records.

Season summary
The Housemates lived in a house with 3 areas. Rich, Normal and Survivor. Every week the housemates had to compete in challenges. Some of these challenges included jumping from a flying helicopter into water. At the beginning of the last two months, the survivor area was used as a punishment zone. The title song this season, "Alles was du willst (Everything You Want)" by Lex. Franziska "Franzi" Lewandrowski won second place and the prize of €50,000. Sascha Sirtl won the season and the prize of €1,000,000.

The 4-hour finale on 1 March 2005 was watched by 30% audience share in targeted 14–29 years.

Housemates

Nominations table

Rounds 1-18

Rounds 19 - Finale

See also
Main Article about the show

External links

2004 German television seasons
2005 German television seasons
05